Muhammad Ibn Muhammad Al-Fulani Al-Kishwani was an early 18th century Fulani mathematician, astronomer, mystic, and astrologer from Katsina, present-day Northern Nigeria.

Al-Kishwani studied at the Gobarau Minaret in Katsina before leaving for Cairo, Egypt in 1732, where he published in Arabic a work titled, "A Treatise on the Magical Use of the Letters of the Alphabet" which is a mathematical scholarly manuscript of procedures for constructing magic squares up to the order 11.
As words of encouragement to the reader he writes:

Do not give up, for that is ignorance and not according to the rules of this art ... Like the lover, you cannot hope to achieve success without infinite perseverance.

Al-Kishwani died in Cairo, Egypt in 1741. He was 42.

References

18th-century astronomers
1690s births
1741 deaths
Year of birth uncertain
African mathematicians